Lake Johanna is a lake in Ramsey County, in the U.S. state of Minnesota.

Lake Johanna was named after Johanna McKenty, an early settler.

See also
List of lakes in Minnesota

References

Lakes of Minnesota
Lakes of Ramsey County, Minnesota